The 12273/74 Howrah–New Delhi Duronto Express is a Duronto class train which operates between the capital of West Bengal, Kolkata and the national capital New Delhi. It is the second Duronto Express connecting Delhi to Kolkata, the other one being the Sealdah–Bikaner Duronto Express. Most of the other Duronto trains take less travel time than their Rajdhani counterparts. Therefore, before the introduction of the Howrah Duronto, it was expected to be the fastest service on the route by many Indian railfans. The Rajdhani Express gets top-most priority on the route, making it the fastest train in the Howrah–Delhi route. But, the Rajdhani continues to be the fastest as both trains cover the same distance and despite being a non-stop service, with no commercial halts, the Duronto takes more time than the Rajdhani. It has been running with modern LHB rakes since 2nd July 2021, having a maximum permissible speed of 130 km/h, thus replacing the hybrid LHB Rakes which have a maximum permissible speed of 130 km/h.

Change in route 
With effect from February 2018 the route of this train was changed from Grand Chord to mainline. Therefore, it now travels 1,531 km rather than 1,452 km. Due to this it takes more time than the Premium Rajdhanis and Sealdah Duronto Express from Kolkata to Delhi. Therefore, its average speed went down from 84 kmph to 70 kmph.

Locomotive

It is hauled by a Howrah-based WAP-5,Howrah-based WAP-7 end to end.

Speed
The maximum permissible speed of the train is up to 130 kmph except some parts. Its all coaches are of air conditioned LHB coach type which is capable of reaching 160 kmph but it does not touch. Sometimes people become confused because according to Indian Railways Permanent Way Manual (IRPWM) on Indian Railways website or Indian Railway Institute of Civil Engineering website, the BG (Broad Gauge) lines have been classified into six groups ‘A’ to ‘E’ on the basis of the future maximum permissible speeds but it may not be same as present speed.

The maximum permissible speed is 130 kmph except two small parts – 29 km long New Delhi (NDLS) – Chipyana Buzurg (CPYZ) part where Railway is trying to raise maximum permissible sectional speed to 130 kmph from 110 kmph [1] and Jhajha – Madhupur part where trains pass through at a maximum permissible speed of 110 kmph . The trains also touch the speed of 100 kmph in a short stretch of approximately for this short distance.

Railway Board has approved the speed policy which envisages operation of passenger trains at 160 kmph on Delhi–Howrah route but it is still unclear what will its impact on this train in future like increasing of speed but not up to 160 kmph or up to 160 kmph.

References

Trains from Howrah Junction railway station
Delhi–Kolkata trains
Duronto Express trains
Rail transport in Uttar Pradesh
Rail transport in Jharkhand
Railway services introduced in 2010